Rhembastus mechowi is a species of leaf beetle of the Democratic Republic of the Congo, described by Julius Weise in 1883.

References

Eumolpinae
Beetles of the Democratic Republic of the Congo
Beetles described in 1883
Taxa named by Julius Weise
Endemic fauna of the Democratic Republic of the Congo